This is a list of natural areas in the U.S. state of Vermont.

Natural areas on public land in Vermont

By definition, natural areas on public land in Vermont are "limited areas of land that have retained their wilderness character." These areas are designated, protected, and managed by the Vermont Department of Forests, Parks and Recreation.

List of natural areas on public land

Map of natural areas on public land

Natural areas on private land in Vermont

List of natural areas on private land

Map of natural areas on private land

See also

 List of Vermont state parks
 List of Vermont state forests

References

External links
 Vermont Natural Areas
 Vermont Department of Forests, Parks and Recreation Natural Areas

Natural areas